Sier is a surname. Notable people with the surname include:

 Brayden Sier (born 1997), Australian rules footballer
 Chris Sier, professor at Newcastle University Business School
 Gerry Sier (1928–2006), Australian rules footballer
 Ken Sier (1922–2001), Australian rules footballer